Floyd Parks is the name of:

 Floyd B. Parks (1911-1942), United States Marine Corps fighter pilot during World War II
 Floyd Lavinius Parks (1896–1959), United States Army lieutenant general